Velum Mayilum Thunai is a 1979 Indian Tamil-language devotional film directed and written by Ra. Sankaran with dialogue by Rajasekaran. The film stars M. R. Radha in dual roles and Baby Sudha. It was released on 23 March 1979.

Plot 

Velayudham is a non-believer in god while his own son Saravanan opposes him in case of the topic divine power.

Cast 
 M. R. Radha as Velayudham and Thanikachalam
 Baby Sudha as Saravanan
 Kannadasan as Kannadasan (Guest appearance)
 Major Sundarrajan as Prohit
 M. N. Rajam as Prohit's Wife
 Neelu as Advocate Appalachari
 Sachu as Poongkodi
 Vijaya Chandrika as Panchali
 I. S. R. as Arjunan
 Jai Ganesh as Kali, Thief
 Raadhika as Valli
 S. V. Ramadas as Elephant driver
 Sripriya as Meenakshi, The dumb girl
 Vijayakumar as Sundaresan, Biscope
 Manorama as Manohari
 Typist Gopu as Ekambaram
 Cho as Manohari's husband

Soundtrack 
The music was composed by  Shankar–Ganesh and the lyrics were written by Kannadasan and Vaali.

Reception
P. S. M. of Kalki praised Ra. Sankaran for providing devotional offering for devotees.

References

External links 

1970s Tamil-language films
1979 films
Films scored by Shankar–Ganesh
Films shot in Madurai
Hindu devotional films